Dys4ia (pronounced dysphoria) is an abstract, autobiographical Adobe Flash video game that Anna Anthropy, also known as Auntie Pixelante, developed to recount her experiences of gender dysphoria and hormone replacement therapy. The game was originally published in Newgrounds but was later removed by Anthropy.

Plot
Touching on the 'frustrations' of transitioning, particularly taking estrogen, the game documents a six-month period in her treatment via a succession of mini-games that reflect on gender politics, identity, personal responsibility, white privilege, and personal development. While discussing the concept with the Penny Arcade Report, Anna Anthropy remarked, "This was a story about frustration—in what other form do people complain as much about being frustrated? A video game lets you set up goals for the player and make her fail to achieve them. A reader can’t fail a book. It’s an entirely different level of empathy that most people simply cannot comprehend, and so the game makes this particular empathetic frustration available for all to experience."

Reception
After debuting at a Toronto-based art game convention between 21 and 23 February 2012, Dys4ia subsequently appeared on the social media website Newgrounds on 9 March 2012, and achieved a First Place 'Daily Feature'. Dys4ia received praise from various sources for its ability to communicate a challenging subject. The Guardians Will Freeman commented that Dys4ia offered 'a touching and witty insight into an experience many may never even consider in detail'. In response to the mechanics of Dys4ia, Freeman suggested that the game 'does much to prove the power of games to communicate complex concepts through playful interactions'. On the UK gaming blog Rock, Paper, Shotgun, journalist Adam Smith found the content 'uncomfortable' and inherently private, yet nevertheless 'informative and moving'. Regarding the absent artistic merits of Dys4ia, Smith remarked that the limited visuals were 'effective communicators of extreme discomfort' and that Liz Ryerson's soundtrack to the game deserved special mention due to how well it conveys a sense of listless frustration and extreme discomfort simultaneously.

References

External links
Dys4ia at Newgrounds (No longer available)
Dys4ia at Auntie Pixelante (also not currently available)
Dys4ia at Freegames.org (available as of 2022-02-20)
Dys4ia internet archive  internet archive backup link to above page (index date 2017-05-07)

2012 video games
Art games
Browser games
Flash games
Transgender-related video games
LGBT-related video games
Video games developed in the United States
Video games designed by Anna Anthropy